The Leeds municipal elections were held on Thursday 1 November 1945. Although a third of the council would ordinarily be up for election, the suspension of elections during World War II meant the council had last held elections in 1938, and with the amount of vacancies and co-options throughout near to two-thirds of the council needed electing.

Labour repeated their earlier national performance and won sweeping victories across the country, with Leeds no exception, picking up 40 of the 48 seats contested (with Richmond Hill going unopposed) and stealing control of the council from the Conservatives.  The Conservatives only managed eight defences, which were confined to their bastions of Far Headingley, Hyde Park, North and Roundhay, although running Labour exceptionally close in Blenheim. The minor parties also failed to escape the Labour tide, as the Liberals lost both their representatives (a councillor and an alderman) and the Communists their sole councillor in Woodhouse - formally Labour, but expelled for alleged Communist sympathies.

As well as the 21 gains Labour made that night, the gentlemen's agreement - signed between Labour and the Conservatives in 1930 to allocate aldermen in proportion to their councillors - further rewarded Labour with an extra five aldermen at mostly Tory expense (the other being the aforementioned Liberal) in recognition of those gains. As a result, Labour emerged with an overall majority of 42 on a turnout of 43.3%.

Election result

The result had the following consequences for the total number of seats on the council after the elections:

Ward results

References

1945 English local elections
1945
1940s in Leeds